Ivan Vasilevich Udodov (20 May 1924 – 16 October 1981) was a Russian weightlifter who won an Olympic gold medal in 1952 and a world title in 1953, both in the bantamweight category (−56 kg). He then moved to the featherweight (−60 kg) class and won silver medals at the world championships of 1954 and 1955. In 1952–54 Udodov set four world records: one in the press, one in the snatch, and two in the total.

Career 
In 1941, when Udodov was 17, he was captured by the Germans and deported to the Buchenwald concentration camp. When he was freed in 1945, he weighed about 30 kg and could not walk on his own. He took up weightlifting to recover his strength, and already in 1949 finished second at the Soviet bantamweight championships. He won the national bantamweight title in 1950–1952. In 1954 Udodov switched to featherweight, and set two world records, but was less successful in competitions, and won only one national title in this division, in 1956. The same year he was not selected to the Olympic team due to an injury. He retired from competitions to become a truck driver and later a weightlifting coach in Rostov.

References

External links 

1924 births
1981 deaths
People from Donetsk Governorate
Buchenwald concentration camp survivors
Russian male weightlifters
Soviet male weightlifters
Olympic weightlifters of the Soviet Union
Weightlifters at the 1952 Summer Olympics
Olympic gold medalists for the Soviet Union
Olympic medalists in weightlifting
Medalists at the 1952 Summer Olympics
World Weightlifting Championships medalists